Dmitrieva is a surname. Notable people with the surname include:

 Anna Dmitrieva (born 1940), tennis player
 Daria Dmitrieva (born 1995), handball player
 Daria Dmitrieva (born 1993), rhythmic gymnast
 Olga Dmitrieva (born 1981), triathlete
 Tatyana Dmitrieva (1951–2010), Russian Minister of Health
 Valentina Dmitryeva (1859–1947), writer
 Yelena Dmitriyeva (born 1983), handball player

See also
 Cherubina de Gabriak, literary pseudonym of Elisaveta Ivanovna Dmitrieva
 Dmitriyev (disambiguation)